RcsR1 (rhizobial cold and salinity stress riboregulator 1) trans-acting sRNA, formerly known as SmelC587, is a stress-related riboregulator, conserved in Sinorhizobium, Rhizobium and Agrobacterium. It contains highly conserved stem-loops involved in the interaction with several target mRNAs (PhoR, MotE, anti-σE1, GntR, FgA, TrpC).  In Sinorhizobium meliloti  RcsR1 less conserved central region is responsible for the species-specific interaction with the 5’UTR of autoinducer synthase encoding mRNA sinI.  The interaction negatively influences sinI translation.

See also 
 SuhB
 EcpR1 sRNA

References 

Non-coding RNA